

The International Labour Organization (ILO), a tripartite specialized agency of the United Nations that sets international standards related to work, has 187 member states, . Established in 1919 as a result of the Treaty of Versailles, the ILO was the first agency to be incorporated into the UN in 1946, is the third oldest pre-existing UN agency, the fourth oldest existing multilateral organization and the only remaining organization with direct links to the League of Nations.

Starting with 42 member states, 29 of these are considered founder members as signatories to the Versailles Treaty, another 13 states, not signatories, were invited to be members and granted status as founder members.

Following the Second World War and the dissolution of the League of Nations, the ILO became the UN's first specialized agency. All member states of the ILO are also member states of the United Nations, however, there are seven UN member states which have not joined the ILO. The ILO's constitution allows admission without membership in the UN, but the conditions to be satisfied in this case are more complex than for a UN member state. 

Since establishment, 19 states have withdrawn from membership, although all subsequently rejoined. Two states have indicated an intention to withdraw, but did not complete the process. While the membership rules admit only sovereign states, on three occasions states with non-sovereign status have been admitted, all, however, eventually became sovereign members. Five states have been removed from membership, with all being readmitted. Six formerly-existing states have been members of the ILO, including two which were founding members.

Member states 

Membership in the ILO is governed by Article 1, clauses 3 and 4, of the organization's constitution. Clause 3 indicates that any UN member state may become a member of the ILO by communicating to the Director-General "formal acceptance of the obligations of the Constitution."  Clause 4 allows for membership for non-UN states, but this requires a two-thirds vote by delegates to the International Labour Conference, including two-thirds of government delegates.

A "+" and a blue background indicates a founding member; an "*" and a khaki background indicates states invited to be founding members.

Member withdrawals 

According to the ILO's constitution, a member state may only withdraw after giving notice of two years and settling all outstanding financial dues; following withdrawal a former member state is still obliged to comply with the ILO conventions the country has ratified.

Readmission of a former member state, that has remained a UN member, requires formal communication to the ILO Director-General of acceptance of the obligations of the ILO constitution. A former member state that is not a UN member can only be approved for readmission by a decision of the International Labour Conference.

Since 1927, 19 member states have withdrawn from the ILO; all subsequently rejoined.

Incomplete member withdrawals 
Two member states have officially communicated an intention to withdraw, but prior to the ILO declaring their membership to have lapsed, subsequently communicated an intention to remain.

States removed from membership 
Due to circumstances related to annexation, five states have been removed from ILO membership; all were later readmitted.

Former non-sovereign state members 

The ILO constitution indicates that members must be states (initially, although not exclusively, members of the League of Nations or, after 1945, members of the United Nations), which has been interpreted to imply those entities with state sovereignty. The basis for this was the 26 August 1930 ruling of the Permanent Court of International Justice which determined that Danzig, whose external relations were under Poland's control, was inadmissible to the ILO. Despite this ruling, three non-sovereign states, prior to achieving sovereign status, were, due to political circumstances, admitted as members of the ILO.

Former members 
 A "+" and blue background indicates an ILO founding member.

UN member states not members of the ILO

UN non-member observer states and the ILO

See also 

 List of specialized agencies of the United Nations
 Member states of the United Nations

References

Notes

Footnotes

Sources

United Nations-related lists
International Labour Organization
International Labour Organization